Raymond Alexander Stevens (born 1 February 1953) is an Australian politician, currently serving as Member of the Legislative Assembly of Queensland representing Mermaid Beach for the Liberal National Party. He previously served as Manager of Opposition Business in the Legislative Assembly.

Early life
Born in Townsville, he received a Bachelor of Arts in Finance and Economics from James Cook University and Macquarie University, and was admitted to the Australian Association of Accountants in 1974, being employed by Price Waterhouse in Sydney. He returned to the family station, "Doncaster" in Richmond, before moving to the Gold Coast in 1979. He ran local businesses in the area and was a councillor on Albert Shire Council from 1988 to 1994, serving as Mayor in 1994. After the amalgamation of Albert and Gold Coast, he was mayor of the latter from 1995 to 1997.

Political career 
Stevens, as member of the Liberal Party, was elected to state parliament in 2006 as the member for Robina, succeeding former state Liberal leader Bob Quinn. At this time he was also appointed as the Shadow Minister for Public Works and Housing from 2006 to 2009, with a brief stint from 2007 to 2008 as the Shadow Minister for Information and Communication Technology.

In 2008, Stevens joined the new Liberal National Party with the rest of his party. The redistribution ahead of the 2009 state election renamed his seat to Mermaid Beach; he was re-elected. And from 2009 to 2010 he was the Shadow Minister for Tourism and Fair trading, before he continued in that role as the Shadow Minister for Tourism and Racing from 2010 to 2011. From early 2011 until the election in 2012 Stevens was the Shadow Parliamentary Secretary for Racing.

With the Liberal National Party winning the 2012 Election, Stevens became the Leader of the House of Queensland and in October 2012 the Assistant Minister to the Premier on e-government.

On 11 September 2012, Stevens sparked racism claims after using the term "Jihad Jackie" in Parliament to describe opposition spokeswoman Jackie Trad (herself of Catholic-Lebanese heritage).  While Stevens withdrew the remark in Parliament upon urging by house speaker, he staunchly maintained using the word Jihad to describe someone of Arabic heritage, on 11 September, was nothing he needed to apologise for. He subsequently said Trad needed to "harden up" and had a "glass jaw".

At a pre-polling booth on 21 January 2015, Stevens was filmed having a bizarre reaction to a journalist asking him questions about a $100 million sky rail project from Mudgeeraba to Springbrook. Stevens had previously stated he had approval from the Integrity Commissioner, but when the journalist asked Stevens for the Commissioner's advice to be released, Stevens refused to answer. When the journalist did not back down and asked how much he could make from the development, Mr Stevens then began to wave his hands and arms up and down in the journalist's face. "That Mermaid Ray really lost the plot, but without saying a word," Donovan said.
"He started doing a dance and gyrating around — this is a Minister of the Crown, we're talking about, let me remind you."

Personal life
Stevens is married with two children.

External links
 Official Biography

References

|-

1953 births
Living people
Liberal Party of Australia members of the Parliament of Queensland
Liberal National Party of Queensland politicians
Members of the Queensland Legislative Assembly
People from the Gold Coast, Queensland
Mayors of Gold Coast
21st-century Australian politicians